The 16th Directors Guild of America Awards, honoring the outstanding directorial achievements in film and television in 1963, were presented in 1964.

Winners and nominees

Film

Television

Honorary Life Member
 Joseph C. Youngerman

External links
 

Directors Guild of America Awards
1963 film awards
1963 television awards
Direct
Direct
1963 awards in the United States